Nevern Bridge (Welsh: Pont Nanhyfer) spans the River Nevern in the centre of Nevern, Pembrokeshire, Wales.

Constructed of rubblestone and ashlar, this humpback bridge has two unequal archesthe south arch is largerand is recessed with keystones.

References

External links
Coflein collection: Nevern Bridge

Bridges in Pembrokeshire
Grade II listed bridges in Wales
Grade II listed buildings in Pembrokeshire